Tevita Komaidruka Vuibau was born on the 24 January 1956. He is a marine geology specialist and former principal scientific officer in the Mineral Resource Department.  In January 2007 he was appointed to the interim cabinet as Minister for Lands and Mineral Resources.

References

Living people
Government ministers of Fiji
I-Taukei Fijian people
Year of birth missing (living people)